Hillia is a genus of flowering plants in the family Rubiaceae. It has 24 species.  All are indigenous to tropical America.

Most of the species are slightly succulent epiphytes or small trees. A few are subshrubs or lianas. Hillia rivalis is a rheophyte. The tissues of all the species contain raphides. The capsules have a beak-like appendage.

Hillia triflora is cultivated as an ornamental plant.

Hillia was named by Nicolaus Jacquin in 1760. It was named for the English botanist John Hill (1716-1775). Jacquin named only one species, Hillia parasitica. It has been suggested that the specific epithet as well as the generic name might well be a reference to John Hill.

Some authors have placed five of the species in a separate genus, Ravnia. A cladistic analysis of morphological characters found Ravnia to be embedded within Hillia. This hypothesis has not been tested with molecular data.

The genera Hillia, Balmea, and Cosmibuena form a monophyletic group. Some authors have designated this group as the tribe Hillieae, but it might be embedded within another tribe, Hamelieae.

Species 
The following species list may be incomplete or contain synonyms.

References

External links 
 Hillia  Search Page  World Checklist of Rubiaceae  Index by Team  Projects  Science Directory  Scientific Research and Data  Kew Gardens
 Hillia  Plant Names  IPNI
 Hillia, page 3  Hillia, page 18  ''Enumeratio systematica plantarum  Titles  Botanicus
 CRC World Dictionary of Plant Names: D-L  Botany & Plant Science  Life Science  CRC Press
 Hillia  List of Genera  Rubiaceae  List of families  Families and Genera in GRIN   Queries  GRIN taxonomy for plants
 Hillia  Hillieae  Cinchonoideae  Rubiaceae  Embryophyta  Streptophytina  Streptophyta  Viridiplantae  Eudaryota  Taxonomy  UniProt

Rubiaceae genera
Hillieae